Hla Myint Swe may refer to:

 Hla Myint Swe (minister), Minister of Transport in Myanmar
 Hla Myint Swe (artist) (born 1948), artist, photographer and author from Myanmar